Musement is an online platform for activities, tours, museums, shows and art events which launched in March 2014  a service initially focused in Europe and then progressively expanding to the rest of the world. Musement aggregates third-party activities and tickets for users to book online. Tour suppliers have access to upload and manage various activities through the platform. The company's offers are available via website, iOS and Android. Once a customer books an activity, they receive a digital voucher or e-ticket for the reservation which can be saved on their device or printed. The company has four major competitors in this market, Viator (acquired by TripAdvisor), GetYourGuide, Berlin-based startup, Klook, Hong Kongbased startup, and Peek.com, a U.S.-based startup. The headquarters are located in Milan.

History
Founded in mid-2013, Musement is an Italian-based start-up that secured funding from 360 Capital Partners (previously invested in YOOX, MutuiOnline), Italian Angels for Growth and other investors in September 2013. It closed $10 million in Series B funding in 2016. Musement acquired Triposo in October 2017.

In September 2018, Musement was acquired by TUI Group.

References

External links
 
 http://www.livemint.com/Leisure/NNkS8xpWYiTow136V1VRiM/Holidays-can-be-a-breeze.html
 https://web.archive.org/web/20140422030622/http://en.startupbusiness.it/news/musement-launches-ios-app-and-prepares-to-disrupt-global-tour-booking-market
 http://www.venturecapitaly.com/2013/11/musement-raises-690k-from-360-capital_1.html
 http://www.ilsole24ore.com/art/tecnologie/2013-10-30/la-startup-musement--raccoglie-690mila-euro-150549.shtml?uuid=ABVebMa

Tourism agencies
Online travel agencies
Italian travel websites
Privately held companies of Italy
Online companies of Italy